Monika Pikuła is a Polish theater and film actress.

She received the Award named after Tadeusz Łomnicki in 2005 for theatrical achievements two years after graduating from the Theater Academy in Warsaw. In 2007, she received Wyróżnienie Award for the role of Zosia in the play Wagon of the Współczesny Theater in Warsaw at the 11th National Festival of Comedy TALIA 2007 in Tarnów.

Biography 
In 2003, she graduated from the Acting Department of the Aleksander Zelwerowicz National Academy of Dramatic Art in Warsaw. Since 2005, she has been an actress employed in the team of the Współczesny Theater in Warsaw.

From 2002 to 2017 she had a relationship with the actor Marcin Bosak, with whom she was engaged. The couple have two sons: Władysław (born July 2008) and Jan (born July 2012).

References 

Living people
1980 births
Polish film actresses
Polish television actresses
Polish stage actresses
Aleksander Zelwerowicz National Academy of Dramatic Art in Warsaw alumni